Bilangin ang Bituin sa Langit (International title: Stars of Hope / ) is a Philippine television drama series broadcast by GMA Network. The series is based on a 1989 Philippine film of the same title. Directed by Laurice Guillen, it stars Nora Aunor, Mylene Dizon and Kyline Alcantara. It premiered on February 24, 2020 on the network's Afternoon Prime line up replacing Madrasta. The series concluded on March 26, 2021 with a total of 80 episodes.

The series is streaming online on YouTube.

Cast and characters

Lead cast
 Nora Aunor as Mercedes "Cedes" Ignacio-Dela Cruz
 Mylene Dizon as Magnolia "Nolie" Ignacio Dela Cruz
 Kyline Alcantara as Margarita "Maggie" D. Santos

Supporting cast
 Zoren Legaspi as Anselmo "Ansel" Santos
 Gabby Eigenmann as Arturo "Arthur" Zulueta
 Ina Feleo as Margaux Salcedo-Santos
 Candy Pangilinan as Connie Herrera
 Yasser Marta as Anselmo "Jun" Santos Jr.
 Isabel Rivas as Martina Santos

Guest cast
 Dante Rivero as Ramon Santos
 Ricky Davao as Damian Dela Cruz
 Divina Valencia as Editha Sinclair
Aifha Medina as Violet
Julia Lee as Lourdes
Frank Garcia as Pocholo
Carlos Agassi as Ringo
Joel Palencia as Oslec

Production
Principal photography was halted in March 2020 due to the enhanced community quarantine in Luzon caused by the COVID-19 pandemic. Filming was continued in October 2020. The series resumed its programming on January 5, 2021.

Ratings
According to AGB Nielsen Philippines' Nationwide Urban Television Audience Measurement People in Television Homes, the pilot episode of Bilangin ang Bituin sa Langit earned a 5.1% rating.

Accolades

References

External links
 
 

2020 Philippine television series debuts
2021 Philippine television series endings
Filipino-language television shows
GMA Network drama series
Live action television shows based on films
Television productions suspended due to the COVID-19 pandemic
Television shows set in the Philippines